Petra Elsterová (born 7 June 1973) is a Czech snowboarder. She competed in the women's parallel giant slalom event at the 2006 Winter Olympics.

References

External links
 

1973 births
Living people
Czech female snowboarders
Olympic snowboarders of the Czech Republic
Snowboarders at the 2006 Winter Olympics
People from Ostrov (Karlovy Vary District)
Sportspeople from the Karlovy Vary Region